Eugen Georg Oskar Ekman (born 27 October 1937) is a retired Finnish gymnast. He competed in all artistic gymnastics events at the 1960 and 1964 Olympics and won a gold medal in pommel horse in 1960. That year he finished sixth all-around, while in 1964 he served as the Olympic flag bearer for Finland at the opening ceremony.

References

External links

1937 births
Living people
Swedish-speaking Finns
Finnish male artistic gymnasts
Gymnasts at the 1960 Summer Olympics
Gymnasts at the 1964 Summer Olympics
Olympic gymnasts of Finland
Olympic gold medalists for Finland
Sportspeople from Vaasa
Olympic medalists in gymnastics
Medalists at the 1960 Summer Olympics